Hoje is the debut major-label studio album by Brazilian singer Ludmilla, released on August 26, 2014 through Warner Music Brazil. The album features 12 songs with 7 written by the singer and the iTunes Store version features two more tracks. Ludmila herself said that the album is her and have all of her.

Tracks listing

iTunes bonus

Usage in media 
 "Hoje" was used in the soundtrack of Rede Globo's telenovela Império.
 "Te Ensinei Certin" is used in the soundtrack of I Love Paraisópolis, also from Rede Globo.

References 

2014 debut albums
Ludmilla (singer) albums